Dean Carney is a former professional rugby league footballer who played in the 1980s. He played for the Cronulla-Sutherland Sharks from 1983 to 1986, the Illawarra Steelers from 1987 to 1988 and finally the Newcastle Knights in 1989.

Playing career
Carney made his debut for Cronulla in Round 1 1983 against Manly-Warringah.  Carney went on to become a regular starter in the team over the next 4 years before joining Illawarra in 1987.  

Carney played with Illawarra for 2 years as the club struggled towards the bottom of the ladder.  In 1989, Carney signed with Newcastle.  Carney only managed to play 2 matches with Newcastle and retired at the end of the season.

Post playing
In 2015, Carney became coach of the Fingal Bay Bomboras.

References

External links
http://www.rugbyleagueproject.org/players/Dean_Carney/summary.html

1961 births
Living people
Australian rugby league players
Cronulla-Sutherland Sharks players
Illawarra Steelers players
Newcastle Knights players
Place of birth missing (living people)
Rugby league players from Wollongong
Rugby league wingers
Rugby league centres
Rugby league second-rows